The Lenovo Vibe K5 is an Android-based smartphone released on June 13, 2016, by Lenovo. It has 13 MP rear camera and 5 MP front camera. It has 2 GB RAM and 16 GB internal storage.

Specifications

Cameras

The Lenovo Vibe K5 has a 13 MP (f/2.2) single rear camera. It also has a LED Flash, and it also supports HDR and Panorama. It can record video in 1080p @ 30fps. It also has a 5 MP (f/2.8) single front camera.

Battery

The Lenovo Vibe K5 has a 2750 mAh Li-ion removable battery.

Display

The Lenovo Vibe K5 has a 5.0 inch IPS LCD display with a resolution of 720 x 1280 pixels. Its ratio is 16:9 and ppi density is 294 ppi.

Operating System

The Lenovo Vibe K5 has Android 5.1 (Lollipop) Operating System.

CPU

The Lenovo Vibe K5 has Qualcomm Snapdragon 415 chipset and Octa-core (4x1.5 GHz Cortex-A53 & 4x1.2 GHz Cortex-A53) CPU. It also has Adreno 405 GPU.

Memory

The Lenovo Vibe K5 has 2 GB RAM and 16 GB (eMMC 4.5) internal storage.

Sound

The Lenovo Vibe K5 has stereo speakers and 3.5 mm jack.

Connectivity

The Lenovo Vibe K5 supports Wi-Fi 802.11 b/g/n, Wi-Fi Hotspot, Bluetooth 4.1, GPS (with A-GPS), FM Radio, microUSB 2.0 and USB On-The-Go. It also supports 2G, 3G and 4G networks.

Body

The Lenovo Vibe K5 has Glass front, aluminum/plastic back and aluminum frame. Its weight is 142 g (5.01 oz). Its dimensions are 142 mm x 71 mm x 8 mm. Its colors are Champagne Gold and Platinum Silver.

Sensors

The Lenovo Vibe K5 has an Accelerometer and a Proximity sensor.

See also

Lenovo Vibe K4 Note
Lenovo
Android (operating system)

References

Lenovo smartphones
Smartphones
Android (operating system) devices
Mobile phones introduced in 2016